A Mountain Goes to Sea, also known as Shipbuilders is a 1943 short Australian documentary directed by Charles Chauvel about the Australian shipbuilders during World War II.

External links
A Mountain Goes to Sea at Australian Screen Online
A Mountain Goes to Sea at National Film and Sound Archive

1943 films
Australian documentary films
1943 documentary films
Australian black-and-white films